Rodney Marvin Love (July 18, 1908 – May 5, 1996) was an American lawyer and politician who served as a one-term U.S. Representative for Ohio's District 3 from 1965 to 1967.

Early life and career 
Rodney M. Love was born in Dayton, Ohio where he graduated from Steele High School in 1926. He was graduated from the Ohio State University, class of 1930, and then attended the University of Dayton Law School where he was graduated in 1933.

Love was admitted to the bar in 1933 and commenced practice in Dayton. In 1941, he became chief deputy in Montgomery County, Ohio probate court, a position he held for four years. He was appointed judge of that probate court in 1945 to fill a vacancy, and was subsequently elected in 1946 to fill the partial term and reelected in 1948 and 1954. Love resigned from the bench in 1960 to return to his private law practice.

Congress 
Rodney M. Love was elected as a Democrat to the 89th United States Congress (January 3, 1965 – January 3, 1967), but was unsuccessful as a candidate for reelection in 1966 to the Ninetieth Congress.

Later career 
In the 1960s, he spoke out against hatred and bigotry. He worked for mental health issues, serving as a Dayton chairman of the Ohio Mental Health Association's chapter and affiliation committee.

Love was elected to Montgomery County (Ohio) Common Pleas Court in 1968 and reelected in 1974, serving until 1980. In retirement, he served by appointment of the Ohio Supreme Court as an active judge.

Death
Rodney M. Love suffered a stroke in Dayton in 1993 and died May 5, 1996 in Mesa, Arizona.

Sources

 Denger, Laurie. "Judge Love Dies; He Was Called 'One Of A Kind'" Dayton Daily News, May 7, 1996, page 1B.

1908 births
1996 deaths
Democratic Party members of the Ohio House of Representatives
Politicians from Dayton, Ohio
University of Dayton alumni
Ohio State University alumni
Ohio state court judges
20th-century American politicians
20th-century American judges
Democratic Party members of the United States House of Representatives from Ohio